Aragüés del Puerto (in Aragonese: both Aragüés de lo Puerto or  Aragüés d'o Puerto) is a municipality located in the province of Huesca, Aragon, Spain. As of 2016 the municipality has a population of 115 inhabitants.

References

Municipalities in the Province of Huesca